This list of works by Richard Meier categorizes the Pritzker-winning American architect's work.

 Westbeth Artists Community, New York City, 1970
 Condominium of the Olivetti Training Center in Tarrytown, New York, 1971
 Meier House, Essex Fells, New Jersey, 1965
 Smith House, Darien, Connecticut, 1965–1967
 Douglas House, Harbor Springs, Michigan, 1973 
 Bronx Developmental Center, The Bronx, New York, 1976
 The Atheneum, New Harmony, Indiana, 1979
 Hartford Seminary, Hartford, Connecticut, 1981
 High Museum of Art, Atlanta, Georgia, 1983
 SiemensForum München, Munich, Germany, 1983
 Des Moines Art Center Modern Art Wing, Des Moines, Iowa, 1984
 Museum für angewandte Kunst, Frankfurt, Germany, 1985
 Grotta House, New Jersey, 1989 []
 Daimler-Benz Forschungszentrum, today: Daimler Forschungszentrum, Ulm, Germany, 1992
 Weishaupt Forum, Schwendi, Germany, 1992
 Stadthaus Ulm, Ulm, Germany, 1994
 Barcelona Museum of Contemporary Art, Barcelona, Spain, 1995
 City Hall and Central Library, The Hague, Netherlands, 1995
 Edinburgh Park Masterplan, 1995
 Rachofsky House, Dallas, Texas, 1996
 Neugebauer House, Naples, Florida, 1998 
 Paley Center for Media, formerly The Museum of Television & Radio, Beverly Hills, California, 1996
 Getty Center, Los Angeles, California, 1997 
 Camden Medical Centre, Singapore, 1998
 White Plaza, Basel, Switzerland, 1998
 173/176 Perry Street, Manhattan, 1999–2002
 Sandra Day O'Connor United States Courthouse, Phoenix, Arizona, 2000 
 Rickmers Group shipping company, Rotherbaum, Hamburg, Germany, 2001
 Peek & Cloppenburg flagship store, Düsseldorf, Germany, 2001
 Cathedral Cultural Center, Garden Grove, California, 2003
 Jubilee Church, Rome, Italy 2003 
 Museum Frieder Burda, Baden-Baden, Germany, 2004
 Ara Pacis Museum, Rome, Italy, 2006  (There has been talk of dismantling and relocating the museum since the election of Gianni Alemanno in 2008)
 City Tower, Prague, Czech Republic, 2004–2007
 Arp Museum, Remagen-Rolandseck, Germany 2008 
 San Jose City Hall, San Jose, California, 2004–2007
 University of Scranton, Connolly Hall, 2007
 Coffee Plaza, HafenCity, Hamburg, Germany, 2008
 Weill Hall, Cornell University, Ithaca, New York, 2008
 Meier on Rothschild, Tel Aviv, Israel (2008–present)
 On Prospect Park, Brooklyn, NY, 2003–2008
 International Coffee Plaza, Hamburg, Germany, 2010 
 Bodrum Houses, Bodrum, Turkey, 2010–present 
 Vinci Partners Corporate Headquarters, Rio de Janeiro, Brazil, 2012 
 Vitrum Apartments, Bogotá, Colombia, 2013 
 Teachers Village, Newark, New Jersey, 2013
 Engel & Völkers, HafenCity, Hamburg, Germany, 2015
 685 First Avenue in Manhattan, New York City, United States, 2018 
 Bridgeport Center, Bridgeport, Connecticut, United States, 1984

References

Meier, Richard